Uidemar Pessoa de Oliveira, usually known as Uidemar (born January 8, 1965), is a retired professional association footballer who played as a defensive midfielder and midfielder for Campeonato Brasileiro Série A clubs Goiás, Flamengo and Fluminense, and for the Brazil national team.

Career
Born in Damolândia, Goiás state, before becoming a professional footballer, Uidemar played for the youth clubs of União Inhumas, Aparecidense and Goiás. He started his professional career playing for Goiás, where he played 71 Campeonato Brasileiro Série A matches and scored 2 goals from 1986 to 1989. During that period he also won the Campeonato Goiano in 1986, 1987 and in 1989. In 1990, he moved to Flamengo, of Rio de Janeiro, where he played 145 matches and scored six goals from 1990 to 1993, winning during that time the Copa do Brasil in 1990, the Campeonato Carioca in 1991, and the Campeonato Brasileiro Série A in 1992. On December 2, 1989, he scored a goal during Zico's farewell match, when Flamengo beat Fluminense 5-0 for the Campeonato Brasileiro Série A. He played for the Mexican side Club León, from 1993 to 1995. In 1995, he returned to Goiás, where he played 14 more Campeonato Brasileiro Série A matches, moving to Botafogo in the following year, where he briefly played, winning Taça Cidade Maravilhosa, then moving in the same year to Fluminense, where he played 19 Campeonato Brasileiro Série A matches. After leaving Fluminense, he played for Araçatuba and Ponte Preta from São Paulo state, then moving to Paysandu in 1999, when he retired.

National team
Uidemar played two matches for the Brazil national team, the first one on December 12, 1987, against West Germany, at Estádio Mané Garrincha, Brasília, in which Brazil and West Germany drew 1-1, and the other one on March 15, 1989, at Verdão, Cuiabá, when Brazil beat Ecuador 2-0.

Retirement
After his retirement, Uidemar moved to Goiânia city, where he opened a sports and recreation center.

Honors
Uidemar won the following honors during his career:

Head coaching honors

References

1965 births
Living people
Brazilian footballers
Brazilian expatriate footballers
Expatriate footballers in Mexico
Brazil international footballers
Campeonato Brasileiro Série A players
Liga MX players
Brazilian football managers
Goiás Esporte Clube players
CR Flamengo footballers
Club León footballers
Botafogo de Futebol e Regatas players
Fluminense FC players
Associação Esportiva Araçatuba players
Associação Atlética Ponte Preta players
São José Esporte Clube players
Paysandu Sport Club players
Nacional Futebol Clube managers
Association football midfielders
Sportspeople from Goiás